Forbidden Planet is a 1956 American science fiction film from Metro-Goldwyn-Mayer, produced by Nicholas Nayfack, and directed by Fred M. Wilcox from a script by Cyril Hume that was based on an original film story by Allen Adler and Irving Block. It stars Walter Pidgeon, Anne Francis, and Leslie Nielsen. Shot in Eastmancolor and CinemaScope, it is considered one of the great science fiction films of the 1950s, a precursor of contemporary science fiction cinema. The characters and isolated setting have been compared to those in William Shakespeare's The Tempest, and the plot contains certain happenings analogous to the play, leading many to consider it a loose adaptation.

Forbidden Planet pioneered several aspects of science fiction cinema. It was the first science fiction film to depict humans traveling in a faster-than-light starship of their own creation. It was also the first to be set entirely on another planet in interstellar space, far away from Earth. The Robby the Robot character is one of the first film robots that was more than just a mechanical "tin can" on legs; Robby displays a distinct personality and is an integral supporting character in the film. Outside science fiction, the film was groundbreaking as the first of any genre to use an entirely electronic musical score, courtesy of Bebe and Louis Barron.

Forbidden Planet'''s effects team was nominated for the Academy Award for Best Visual Effects at the 29th Academy Awards. In 2013, the picture was entered into the Library of Congress' National Film Registry, being deemed "culturally, historically, or aesthetically significant". Tony Magistrale describes it as one of the best examples of early techno-horror.

Plot

In the 23rd century, after more than a year's journey, the United Planets starship C-57D arrives at the distant planet Altair IV to determine the fate of an expedition sent there 20 years before. Dr. Edward Morbius, one of the original expedition's scientists, warns the ship not to land for safety reasons, but Commander John J. Adams ignores Morbius' warning.

Adams and Lieutenants Jerry Farman and "Doc" Ostrow are met by Robby the Robot, who transports them to Morbius' residence. Morbius describes how all other members of their expedition had been killed one-by-one, by an unseen "planetary force" and how their ship was vaporized as the last survivors tried to lift off. Only Morbius, his wife (who later died of natural causes), and their daughter Altaira were somehow immune. Morbius offers to help the starship return home, but Adams says he must receive further instructions from Earth.

The next day, Adams finds Farman kissing Altaira. Furious, he dresses down Farman and criticizes Altaira for being naive and wearing revealing clothes that make her too attractive. That night, an invisible intruder sabotages equipment aboard the starship. The next morning, Adams and Ostrow go to Morbius’ residence to discuss the intrusion. While waiting, Adams happens upon Altaira swimming. After she dons a new, less revealing dress, Adams apologizes for his behavior toward her, and they kiss. They are suddenly attacked by Altaira's pet tiger, and Adams is forced to disintegrate it with his blaster.

Morbius appears and tells Adams and Ostrow that he has been studying artifacts of the Krell, a highly advanced race that perished overnight 200,000 years before. One such device enhances the intellect, which Morbius had used. He barely survived, but his intellectual capacity had doubled. Another is a vast  square underground machine, still functioning, powered by 9,200 thermonuclear reactors, operating "in tandem". Adams tells Morbius he must share these discoveries with Earth. Morbius refuses, saying "humanity is not yet ready to receive such limitless power".

Adams erects a force field fence around the starship, but the intruder easily passes through and murders Chief Engineer Quinn. Morbius warns Adams of his premonition of further deadly attacks. That night, the invisible intruder returns, outlined by the force field energy as the ship's multiple blasters fire at it, with no effect. The thing kills Farman and two other crewmen. When Morbius is awakened by Altaira's screams, the creature suddenly vanishes.

Adams tries to persuade Altaira to leave. Ostrow sneaks away and uses the Krell intellect enhancer and is fatally injured. Before dying, he informs Adams that the Krell machine can create anything by mere thought, but the Krell forgot one thing: "monsters from the id". The machine gave the Krell’s subconscious desires free rein with unlimited power, causing their extinction. Adams states that Morbius's enhanced subconscious had the machine create the thing that both killed the original expedition members and attacked his crewmen. Morbius refuses to believe him.

Altaira tells Morbius she is leaving with Adams. Robby detects the creature approaching from the southwest. Morbius commands Robby to kill it, but the robot knows it is Morbius and shuts down. Adams, Altaira, and Morbius hide in the Krell lab, but the creature melts its way through the thick doors. Morbius accepts the truth, confronts and disowns his other self, and the Id monster vanishes, leaving Morbius fatally injured. Before he dies, he has Adams activate a planetary self-destruct system, warning them they must be far away in deep space. At a safe distance, Adams, Altaira, Robby, and the surviving crew watch the obliteration of Altair IV. Adams reassures Altaira that in about a million years, the human race will become like the Krell, and these events will remind them they are, after all, not God. They embrace as the C-57D heads back to Earth.

Cast

Production

The screenplay by Irving Block and Allen Adler, written in 1952, was originally titled Fatal Planet. The later screenplay draft by Cyril Hume renamed the film Forbidden Planet, because this was believed to have greater box-office appeal. Block and Adler's drama took place in the year 1976 on the planet Mercury. An Earth expedition headed by John Grant is sent to the planet to retrieve Dr. Adams and his daughter Dorianne, who have been stranded there for twenty years. From then on, its plot is roughly the same as that of the completed film, though Grant is able to rescue both Adams and his daughter and escape the invisible monster stalking them.

The film sets for Forbidden Planet were constructed on a Metro-Goldwyn-Mayer (MGM) sound stage at its Culver City film lot and were designed by Cedric Gibbons and Arthur Lonergan. The film was shot entirely indoors, with all the Altair IV exterior scenes simulated using sets, visual effects, and matte paintings.

A full-size mock-up of roughly three-quarters of the starship was built to suggest its full width of 170 ft (51 m). The starship was surrounded by a huge, painted cyclorama featuring the desert landscape of Altair IV; this one set took up all of the available space in one of the Culver City sound stages. Principal photography took place from April 18 to late May 1955.

Later, many costume and prop items were reused in several different episodes of the television series The Twilight Zone, most of which were filmed by Rod Serling's Cayuga Productions at the MGM studio in Culver City, including Robby the Robot, the various C-57D models, the full-scale mock-up of the base of the ship (which featured in the episodes "To Serve Man" and "On Thursday We Leave for Home"), the blaster pistols and rifles, crew uniforms, and special effects shots.

At a cost of roughly $125,000, Robby the Robot was very expensive for a film prop at this time; it represented almost 7% of the film's $1.9 million budget and equates to at least $1 million in 2017 dollars. Both the electrically controlled passenger vehicle driven by Robby and the truck/tractor-crane off-loaded from the starship were also constructed especially for this film. Robby also starred in the science fiction film The Invisible Boy (1957) and later appeared in many TV series and films.

The animated sequences of Forbidden Planet, especially the attack of the Id Monster, were created by veteran animator Joshua Meador, who was loaned to MGM by Walt Disney Productions. According to a "Behind the Scenes" featurette on the film's DVD, a close look at the creature shows it to have a small goatee beard, suggesting its connection to Dr. Morbius, the only character with this physical feature. Unusually, the scene in which the Id Monster is finally revealed during its attack on the Earth ship was not created using traditional cel animation. Instead, Meador simply sketched each frame of the entire sequence in black pencil on animation stand translucent vellum paper; each page was then photographed in high contrast, so that only the major details remained visible. These images were then photographically reversed into negative and the resulting white line images were then tinted red, creating the effect of the Id Monster's body remaining largely invisible, with only its major outlines illuminated by the energy from the force-field and blaster beams.

ReceptionForbidden Planet had its world premiere at the Southeastern Science Fiction Convention in Charlotte, North Carolina, on March 3 and 4, 1956. The film opened in more than 100 cities on March 23 in CinemaScope, Eastmancolor, and in some theaters, stereophonic sound, either by the magnetic or Perspecta processes.

The film received positive reviews from critics. Bosley Crowther of The New York Times wrote that everyone who worked on the film certainly "had a barrel of fun with it. And, if you've got an ounce of taste for crazy humor, you'll have a barrel of fun, too." Variety wrote: "Imaginative gadgets galore, plus plenty of suspense and thrills, make the Nicholas Nayfack production a top offering in the space travel category." Harrison's Reports called the film "weird but fascinating and exciting," with "highly imaginative" production. Philip K. Scheuer of the Los Angeles Times wrote that the film was "more than another science-fiction movie, with the emphasis on fiction; it is a genuinely thought-through concept of the future, and the production MGM has bestowed on it gives new breadth and dimension to that time-worn phrase, 'out of this world.'" John McCarten of The New Yorker called the film "a pleasant spoof of all the moonstruck nonsense the movies have been dishing up about what goes on among our neighbors out there in interstellar space." The Monthly Film Bulletin of Britain praised the film as "an enjoyably thorough-going space fantasy," adding, "In tone the film adroitly combines naivete with sophistication, approaching its inter-planetary heroics with a cheerful consciousness of their absurdity that still allows for one or two genuinely weird and exciting moments, such as the monster's first advance on the spaceship." The Philadelphia film critic Steve Friedman ("Mr. Movie") told interviewers that Forbidden Planet was his favorite film. He watched it 178 times. At the review aggregator website Rotten Tomatoes, the film holds a rating of 97%.

According to MGM records, the film initially earned $1,530,000 in the U.S. and Canada and $1,235,000 elsewhere resulting in a profit of $210,000.Forbidden Planet was re-released to film theaters during 1972 as one of MGM's "Kiddie Matinee" features; it was missing about six minutes of film footage cut to ensure it received a G rating from the Motion Picture Association of America, including a 1950s-style muted nude scene of Anne Francis swimming without a bathing suit. Later video releases carry a G rating, although they are all the original theatrical version.

The American Film Institute nominated the film as one of its top-10 science fiction films. The score was nominated for AFI's 100 Years of Film Scores.

Home mediaForbidden Planet was first released in the pan and scan format in 1983 on MGM VHS and Betamax videotape and on MGM laser disc and CED Videodisc; years later, in 1996, it was again re-issued by MGM/UA, but this time in widescreen VHS and laserdisc, both for the film's 40th anniversary. But it was The Criterion Collection that later re-issued Forbidden Planet in CinemaScope's original wider screen 2.55-to-1 aspect ratio, on a deluxe laserdisc set, with various extra features on a second disc. Warner Bros. next released the film on DVD in 1999 (MGM's catalog of films has since remained under ownership of Turner Entertainment, currently a division of Warner Bros. Discovery). Warner's release offered both cropped and widescreen picture formats on the same disc.

For the film's 50th anniversary, the Ultimate Collector's Edition was released on November 28, 2006, in an oversized red metal box, using the original film poster for its wraparound cover. Both DVD and high definition HD DVD formats were available in this deluxe package. Inside both premium packages were the films Forbidden Planet and The Invisible Boy, The Thin Man episode "Robot Client" ("Robby The Robot", one of the film's co-stars, was also a guest star in both The Thin Man episode and The Invisible Boy) and a documentary Watch the Skies!: Science Fiction, The 1950s and Us. Also included were miniature lobby cards and an 8 cm (3-inch) toy replica of Robby the Robot. This was quickly followed by the release of the Forbidden Planet 50th Anniversary edition in both standard DVD and HD DVD packaging. Both 50th anniversary formats were mastered by Warner Bros.-MGM techs from a fully restored, digital transfer of the film. A Blu-ray edition of Forbidden Planet was released on September 7, 2010.

Novelization

Shortly before the film was released, a novelization appeared in hardcover and then later in mass-market paperback; it was written by W. J. Stuart (the pseudonym of mystery novelist Philip MacDonald), which chapters the novel into separate first person narrations by Dr. Ostrow, Commander Adams, and Dr. Morbius. The novel delves further into the mysteries of the vanished Krell and Morbius' relationship to them. In the novel, he repeatedly exposes himself to the Krell's manifestation machine, which (as suggested in the film) boosts his brain power far beyond normal human intelligence. Unfortunately, Morbius retains enough of his imperfect human nature to be afflicted with hubris and a contempt for humanity. Not recognizing his own base primitive drives and limitations proves to be Morbius' downfall, as it had for the extinct Krell. While not stated explicitly in the film (although the basis for a deleted scene first included as an extra with the Criterion Collection's LaserDisc set and included with both the later 50th anniversary DVD and current Blu-ray releases), the novelization compared Altaira's ability to tame the tiger (until her sexual awakening with Commander Adams) to the medieval myth of a unicorn being tamable only by a virgin.

The novel also includes some elements never included in the film: For one, Adams, Farman, and Ostrow clandestinely observe Morbius' house overnight one evening, but see or hear nothing.   When they leave they accidentally kill one of Altaira's pet monkeys.  When Dr. Ostrow later on dissects the dead animal he discovers that its internal structure precludes it from ever having been alive in the normal biological sense. The tiger, deer, and monkeys are all conscious creations by Dr. Morbius as companions ("pets") for his daughter and only outwardly resemble their Earth counterparts. The novel also differs somewhat from the film in that it does not directly establish the great machine as the progenitor of the animals or monster; instead only attributes them to Morbius' elevated mental power. The Krell's self-destruction can be interpreted by the reader as a cosmic punishment for misappropriating the life-creating power of God. This is why in the film's ending, Commander Adams says in his speech to Altaira "...we are, after all, not God". The novel ends with a postscript making a similar observation.

SoundtrackForbidden Planets innovative electronic music score, credited as "electronic tonalities", partly to avoid having to pay any of the film industry music guild fees, was composed by Bebe and Louis Barron. MGM producer Dore Schary discovered the couple quite by chance at a beatnik nightclub in Greenwich Village while on a family Christmas visit to New York City; Schary hired them on the spot to compose his film's musical score. While the theremin (which was not used in Forbidden Planet) had been used on the soundtrack of Alfred Hitchcock's Spellbound (1945), the Barrons' electronic composition is credited with being the first completely electronic film score; their soundtrack preceded the invention of the Moog synthesizer by eight years (1964).

Using ideas and procedures from the book Cybernetics: Or Control and Communication in the Animal and the Machine (1948) by the mathematician and electrical engineer Norbert Wiener, Louis Barron constructed his own electronic circuits that he used to generate the score's "bleeps, blurps, whirs, whines, throbs, hums, and screeches". Most of these sounds were generated using an electronic circuit called a ring modulator. After recording the basic sounds, the Barrons further manipulated the sounds by adding other effects, such as reverberation and delay, and reversing or changing the speeds of certain sounds.

Since Bebe and Louis Barron did not belong to the Musicians Union, their work could not be considered for an Academy Award, in either the "soundtrack" or the "sound effects" categories. MGM declined to publish a soundtrack album at the time that Forbidden Planet was released. However, film composer and conductor David Rose later published a 7-inch (18 cm) single of his original main title theme that he had recorded at the MGM Studios in Culver City during March 1956. Rose was originally hired to compose the musical score in 1955, but his main title theme was discarded when he was discharged from the project by Dore Schary, sometime between Christmas 1955 and New Year's Day. The film's original theatrical trailer contains snippets of Rose's score, the tapes of which Rose reportedly later destroyed.

The Barrons finally released their soundtrack in 1976 as an LP album for the film's 20th anniversary; it was on their very own Planet Records label (later changed to Small Planet Records and distributed by GNP Crescendo Records). The LP premiered at MidAmeriCon, the 34th World Science Fiction Convention, held in Kansas City, MO, over the 1976 Labor Day weekend, as part of a 20th Anniversary celebration of Forbidden Planet held at that Worldcon; the Barrons were there promoting their album's first release, signing all the copies sold at the convention. They also introduced the first of three packed-house screenings that showed an MGM 35mm fine-grain vault print in original CinemaScope and stereophonic sound. A decade later, in 1986, their soundtrack was released on a music CD for the film's 30th Anniversary, with a six-page color booklet containing images from Forbidden Planet, plus liner notes from the composers, Bebe and Louis Barron, and Bill Malone.

A tribute to the film's soundtrack was performed live in concert by Jack Dangers, available on disc one of the album Forbidden Planet Explored.

Costumes and props
The costumes worn by Anne Francis were designed by Helen Rose. Her miniskirts resulted in Forbidden Planet being banned in Spain; it was not shown there until 1967. Other costumes were designed by Walter Plunkett.

Robby the Robot was operated by diminutive stuntman Frankie Darro. He was fired shortly after an early scene began, having had a "five-martini lunch" prior to the scene being shot; he nearly fell over while trying to walk while inside the expensive prop.

In late September 2015, several screen-used items from Forbidden Planet were offered in Profiles in History's Hollywood Auction 74, including Walter Pidgeon's "Morbius" costume, an illuminating blaster rifle, blaster pistol, a force field generator post, and an original Sascha Brastoff steel prehistoric fish sculpture seen outside Morbius' home; also offered were several lobby cards and publicity photos.
On November 2, 2017, the original Robby the Robot prop was offered for auction by Bonhams, and it earned US$5.3 million, including the buyer's premium. It set a new record for TCM-Bonhams auctions, surpassing the US$4 million earned for a Maltese Falcon in 2013, making it the most valuable film prop ever sold at auction.

In popular culture

An Australian radio adaptation using the original electronic music and noted local actors was broadcast in June 1959 on The Caltex Radio Theatre.

In Stephen King's The Tommyknockers, Altair-4 is frequently referenced as the home planet of the titular alien presence.

In the authorized biography of Star Trek creator Gene Roddenberry, he notes that Forbidden Planet "was one of [his] inspirations for Star Trek".

Elements of the Doctor Who serial Planet of Evil were consciously based on Forbidden Planet.

In the novel Strata by Terry Pratchett the main characters get stranded on a disc world which is driven completely by underground machinery. Close to the end, an explicit reference is made: "Didn’t you ever see Forbidden Planet? Human movie. They remade it five, six times".Forbidden Planet and star Anne Francis are named alongside ten other classic science fiction films in the opening song "Science Fiction Double Feature" in the stage musical The Rocky Horror Show and its subsequent film adaptation.

The British musical Return to the Forbidden Planet was inspired by and loosely based on the MGM film, and won the Olivier Award for best musical of 1989/90.

A scene from the science fiction TV series Babylon 5, set on the Epsilon III Great Machine bridge, strongly resembles the Krell's great machine. While this was not the intent of the show's producer, the special effects crew, tasked with creating the imagery, stated that the Krell's machine was a definite influence on their Epsilon III designs. Also, Season 2 episode 5 "The Long Dark" features an invisible creature, that when shot is made visible with very similar effects as the invisible creature from Forbidden Planet.The Time Tunnel pilot episode featured a matte shot of huge underground buildings and people running across a walkway above a giant power generator, in homage to the scene of the Krell's underground complex.The Outer Limits episode "The Man with the Power" revisits the premise of a person's subconscious manifesting as a destructive, murderous entity.

For the film's 50th anniversary in 2006, DAW Books released an original mass-market paperback anthology of new science fiction short stories, Forbidden Planets, all of which were inspired by the film.Fallout: New Vegas DLC Old World Blues uses multiple references, including Doctor Mobius as a reference to Morbius in the film, the protectrons being modeled after Robby the Robot, and The Forbidden Dome being based on the film's title.

In the first Mass Effect game, while examining the planets in the Gagarin system of the Armstrong Nebula, specifically on the planet's Junthor survey feed, a reference is made to "Monsters from the id".

Author George R. R. Martin cites Forbidden Planet as his favorite science fiction film and states that he owns a working, 1:1 (full size) Robby the Robot replica made by robot prop maker Fred Barton Productions.

In the Firefly film Serenity, one of the vehicles they examine on the planet Miranda has "C-57D" stenciled on its side.

In the Columbo (TV series) episode "Mind Over Mayhem" (1974), a robot called "MM7" is featured. Its top half is almost identical to Robby the Robot as he appears in the 1956 film. Differences in the hands, chest panel, and a metal skirting replacing the legs suggest it is not the original film prop.

In the Castle episode "Law & Murder" (2011) Forbidden Planet is playing at the Angelika Film Center. Castle, who is a fan of the film, invites his daughter to go with him to see it, but she has made other plans. At the end of the episode, Beckett tells Castle she is going to see it, and by feigning ignorance ("Forbidden Planet? Is...Is that the one with the robot?") Castle succeeds in getting Beckett to treat him to see the film.

Robby the Robot makes many cameo appearances in television and film. Examples include episodes of The Perry Como Show, Hazel, The Many Loves of Dobie Gillis, The Twilight Zone, The Banana Splits, Mork and Mindy, Wonder Woman, The Man from UNCLE, Ark II, Lost in Space, Space Academy, Project UFO and The Love Boat. Robby was also featured in the films Cherry 2000, Gremlins, The Invisible Boy, Invasion of the Neptune Men, Hollywood Boulevard, and Dünyayı Kurtaran Adam . He also has appeared on numerous magazine covers, record sleeves, and in some TV commercials.

Cancelled remake
New Line Cinema had developed a remake with James Cameron, Nelson Gidding, and Stirling Silliphant involved at different times. In 2007, DreamWorks set up the project with David Twohy set to direct. Warner Bros. re-acquired the rights the following year and on October 31, 2008, J. Michael Straczynski was announced as writing a remake, Joel Silver was to produce. Straczynski explained that the original had been his favorite science fiction film, and it gave Silver an idea for the new film that makes it "not a remake", "not a re-imagining", and "not exactly a prequel". His vision for the film would not be retro, because when the original was made it was meant to be futuristic. Straczynski met with people working in astrophysics, planetary geology, and artificial intelligence to reinterpret the Krell back-story as a film trilogy. In March 2009, Straczynski reported that the project was abandoned, and that a new script was requested.

Notes

References

Bibliography

 Alexander, David (1996). Star Trek" Creator: Authorized Biography of Gene Roddenberry. London: Boxtree. .
 Booker, M. Keith (2010). Historical Dictionary of Science Fiction Cinema. Metuchen, New Jersey: Scarecrow Press, Inc. .
 Lev, Peter (2006). Transforming the Screen, 1950–1959. History of the American Cinema 7. Oakland, California: University of California Press. .
 Miller, Scott (2011). "Return to the Forbidden Planet" . Sex, Drugs, Rock & Roll, and Musical Theatre. Boston: Northeastern University. .
 Prock, Stephan. "Strange Voices: Subjectivity and Gender in 'Forbidden Planet's Soundscape of Tomorrow" . Journal of the Society for American Music, 8.3 (2014), pp. 371–400.
 Ring, Robert C (2011). Sci-Fi Movie Freak. Iola, Wisconsin: Krause Publications, a division of F+W Media. .
 Stuart, W.J.; MacDonald, Philip (1956) Forbidden Planet (A Novel), New York: Farrar, Straus and Cudahy. 
 Warren, Bill (2009). Keep Watching the Skies: American Science Fiction Films of the 1950s, 21st Century Edition. Jefferson, North Carolina" McFarland & Company .
 Wierzbicki, James (2005). Louis and Bebe Barron's Forbidden Planet: A Film Score Guide. Metuchen, New Jersey: Scarecrow Press. .
 Wilson, Robert Frank (2000). Shakespeare in Hollywood, 1929–1956''. Madison, New Jersey: Fairleigh Dickinson University Press. .

External links

Forbidden Planet essay by Ian Olney at National Film Registry

 
 
 
 "Forbidden Planet" at Internet Archives
 
 DVD Journal review
 NPR: The Barrons: Forgotten Pioneers of Electronic Music
 "Strange Voices: Subjectivity and Gender in ''Forbidden Planet'''s Soundscape of Tomorrow" in Journal of the Society for American Music
 Cinematographic analysis of Forbidden Planet
 "Geological Time Termination in a SciFi Biosphere: An Alternative View of The Forbidden Planet" 
 Forbidden Planet by David Rose and his Orchestra – MGM Records 7" single release of Rose's original (unused) theme music for the film

1956 films
1950s American films
1950s English-language films
1950s monster movies
1950s science fiction films
Altair in fiction
American films with live action and animation
American robot films
American science fiction action films
American space adventure films
CinemaScope films
Electronic soundtracks
Films about invisibility
Films based on The Tempest
Films based on works by William Shakespeare
Films directed by Fred M. Wilcox
Films set in the 23rd century
Films set on fictional planets
Films shot in California
Films with screenplays by Allen Adler
Films with screenplays by Cyril Hume
Films using stop-motion animation
Metro-Goldwyn-Mayer films
United States National Film Registry films